Alphitomancy (from , and ) is a form of divination involving barley cakes or loaves of barley bread.

When someone in a group was suspected of a crime, the members of the group would be fed barley cakes or slices of barley bread.  Supposedly, the guilty party would get indigestion, while all others would feel well.

See also

 Corsned
 Alphito
 Crithomancy

References

Divination
Breads